Vicente Castelo Sotto III (born August 24, 1948), professionally known as Tito Sotto, is a Filipino politician, entertainer and athlete who served as Senate President from 2018 to 2022. Before that, he had two stints each as Senate Majority Leader and Senate Minority Leader. He served a total of four terms in the Senate: 1992 to 2004 and 2010 to 2022, tying the record for the longest-serving Senator with Lorenzo Tañada and Franklin Drilon. In between his stints in the Senate, he led the Dangerous Drugs Board for a year. He became the Vice Mayor of Quezon City from 1988 to 1992, and later unsuccessfully ran for vice president in the 2022 elections as Panfilo Lacson's running mate.

Beyond politics, Sotto is an accomplished songwriter, known for founding the iconic musical group VST & Co. alongside his brothers Vic and Val Sotto, which is considered one of the best Filipino bands of all-time and the "pioneer of the Manila sound". 

In television, he is known as a co-host of Eat Bulaga!, the longest-running variety show in Philippine television history, and has appeared in numerous television shows and films as an actor. He is colloquially dubbed as "Tito Sen" by audience viewers.

As an athlete, Sotto was also a member of the Philippine national bowling team, representing the country several times at the AMF World Cup. He notably won a bronze medal in the 1978 Asian Games.

Early life and education
Sotto was born on August 24, 1948. His parents were Marcelino Antonio Ojeda Sotto Sr. (1916-1999) and Dr. Herminia Castelo Sotto. His siblings are Valmar (born 1945), Marvic Valentin (born 1954), and Marcelino Antonio Jr. (born 1951).

Sotto's paternal grandfather and namesake was former senator Vicente Sotto (1877–1950). Sottos's brother, Filemon (1872–1966) also served as a senator and was one of those who drafted the 1935 Constitution.

Sotto studied at Colegio de San Juan de Letran in Intramuros, Manila for his elementary, high school, and college education, earning a Bachelor of Arts degree majoring in English.

Entertainment career
Sotto's career started in the 1960s when he joined the combo Tilt Down Men; one of its members was his brother Val. The band played covers of the Dave Clark Five and later he became the vice president of Vicor Music Corporation. Vicor founder Orly Ilacad also had a career in the 1960s like Sotto, Orly Ilacad & the Ramrods. In 1977, he was the vocalist for the short-lived group Bluejeans. He wrote the music for "Balatkayo" by Anthony Castelo which was Castelo's hit. He also formed the Manila sound group VST & Company on which the meaning of VST were his initials. Among his notable compositions is "Magkaisa", which is recognized as one of the anthems of the 1986 People Power Revolution.

Political career

Vice Mayor of Quezon City (1988–1992) 
Sotto was vice mayor of Quezon City from 1988 to 1992. He founded the Vice-Mayors' League of the Philippines and served as its first president. During this period, Sotto was also named Vice Chairman of Citizens' Drugwatch.

First two terms in Senate (1992–2004)
Sotto was elected to the Senate of the Philippines in the 1992 senatorial election, topping the tally with nearly 12 million votes, more than 3 million more than his second place ranker. This made him the third member of his family to enter the Senate, after his grandfather Vicente Sotto and granduncle Filemon Sotto. He served as Assistant Majority Floor Leader, was a member of the Commission on Appointments, and served as chairman on several senate committees. In the 1998 senatorial election, Sotto earned another term in the Senate with a third place finish, the best result among senators vying for re-election.

From April 30 to May 1, 2001, together with Juan Ponce Enrile, Gregorio Honasan, Panfilo Lacson and Miriam Defensor Santiago, he led the EDSA III protests in support of Joseph Estrada. On May 1, 2001, the protesters stormed Malacañang Palace.

In spite of this, he ran for another term in the Senate in 2007 under the TEAM Unity coalition backed by the Arroyo administration, but was unsuccessful, finishing in 19th place.

Chairman of the Dangerous Drugs Board (2008–2009)
Sotto was appointed by President Gloria Macapagal Arroyo as a member of the board of directors and acting chairman of the Dangerous Drugs Board on July 4, 2008, succeeding Anselmo Avenido whose term was expiring that day. The appointment was just over one year after his failed 2007 senatorial bid. Philippine election laws forbid defeated candidates from being appointed to government posts within a year of the election. He served until November 2009.

Third term in Senate (2010–2016)
In late 2009, he resigned as chair of the Dangerous Drugs Board to file his certificate of candidacy as Senator, seeking a comeback to the Senate. He ran under the Nationalist People's Coalition party but campaigned alone because he was not included on any ticket. During the campaign period, he was notably endorsed by Kris Aquino.

After the conclusion of the 2010 Philippine Senate election, Sotto won a seat and placed ninth among twelve winning candidates with roughly twelve million votes, giving him his third non-consecutive term in the upper house.

Upon the commencement of the 15th Congress on July 26, 2010, he was elected by the majority of his fellow senators as the Majority Leader of the Senate as well as the
Chairman of its Committee on Rules, thus he manages the legislative affairs of the Senate, particularly on the floor during the sessions. He was also one of the 20 senators that voted to convict Chief Justice Renato Corona and to remove him from office on May 29 of that year.

In July 2013, at the end of the 15th congress, Sotto resigned as the Majority Leader following the resignation of Juan Ponce Enrile, his staunch political mentor, as Senate President. Enrile resigned due to allegations of misusing the Senate funds. Then assistant majority leader Senator Gregorio Honasan became the acting Majority Leader following Sotto's resignation.

On the commencement of the session of the 16th Congress, on July 22, 2013, Sotto became part of the new Senate minority group. He was chosen by his colleagues in the minority to be the Deputy Floor Leader, second-in-command to Enrile who became the Minority Leader. In July 2014, following Enrile's arrest on charges of plunder relating to the pork barrel scam, Sotto became the acting Minority Floor Leader. Enrile resumed his position as the Minority Floor Leader after he was granted bail by the Supreme Court in August 2015.

In 2013, Sotto filed a bill that would mandate all government and non-government employees to receive a 14th month of annual salary. Responding to the Department of Labor and Employment claims that the bill would worsen unemployment if implemented, Sotto said that the existing 13th month pay is not truly a bonus because there are actually 13 months in a year. "There are 52 weeks in a year divide it by four weeks in a month. Thirteen months."

Fourth term in Senate (2016–2022): Senate presidency

Senator Sotto was re-elected in the 2016 elections. With 17.2 million votes, he finished in third place for the twelve contested senate seats. On July 25, 2016, during the opening of the 17th Congress, Sotto was again elected as Majority Leader. He was also elected as chairman of the Senate committee on rules and the Senate committee on ethics and privileges. Being a member of the NPC, Sotto is part of the "supermajority" coalition led by the PDP–Laban, the political party of President Rodrigo Duterte and Senate President Aquilino Pimentel III.

Sotto has expressed his support for the revival of the death penalty, but only for "high level drug trafficking".

On May 3, 2017, during the Commission on Appointments' (CA) hearing on Judy Taguiwalo's appointment as Secretary of Social Welfare and Development, Sotto, a member of the CA, made controversial remarks which seemed to belittle Taguiwalo for being a single parent.

One of Taguiwalo's daughters demanded a public apology from Sotto over his offensive remarks, asserting that "no woman deserves that kind of treatment". The Gabriela Women's Party also demanded for a public apology, claiming that Sotto "went out of bounds" insulting solo parents and insinuating malice at Taguiwalo. The Commission on Human Rights condemned the event saying: "It is deplorable that such a comment came from an elected senator and that it elicited laughter from the halls of the Congress. The incident shows how those charged by law to protect women from discrimination often forget and unwittingly become promoters of discrimination themselves". A statement from the Philippine Commission on Women called the incident "a mockery of a woman's circumstance as a solo parent as [the] status has nothing to do with her professional qualifications." Representatives Antonio Tinio (ACT Teachers Partylist) and Ariel Casilao (Anakpawis) deprecated the behavior of their colleagues in Congress for tolerating Sotto's remarks. Filipino netizens also criticized Sotto, who became a trending topic on Twitter that day. Some social media users even reminded him that his daughter, Ciara Sotto, is also a single mother. Singer-actress Lea Salonga, who was single-handedly raised by her mother, decried Sotto's remarks. Celebrity single mothers Pokwang, LJ Reyes, Geneva Cruz, and Claudine Barretto also denounced Sotto's remarks and expressed support for their fellow single mothers.

In an interview after the hearing, Sotto apologized and claimed that Taguiwalo was not offended by his remarks. He reasoned that perhaps people were just "overly sensitive" and did not "understand the joke". He also added:

On May 4, Secretary Judy Taguiwalo accepted Sotto's apology, but clarified that "the apology does not fully capture the extent of the gravity of what his 'joke' implied." She also asserted that despite accepting Sotto's apology, she will not tolerate misogyny, anti-women comments, and attacks towards solo parents. Taguiwalo also thanked Sotto for supporting her confirmation as DSWD secretary. She, however, also thanked those who expressed their condemnation of Sotto's statements, and those who supported her and all solo parents.

Despite Sotto's apology, and Taguiwalo's acceptance thereof, eight women's and workers’ groups filed an ethics complaint against the senator on May 10, 2017. Among these groups were Coalition Against Trafficking in Women – Asia Pacific and Partido ng Manggagawa. The said groups claimed that the aforementioned apology was insincere and that Sotto normalized patriarchal views and trivialized the abandonment of responsibility over children. The complaint was filed with the Senate committee on ethics and privileges, of which Sotto is the chairman. Sotto welcomed the complaint and declared his intention to go on leave from his committee as soon as he receives the complaint officially.

On May 9, the Federation of Solo Parents in Luzvimin (FSPL) approached Senator Sotto in his office and requested his support for the passage of amendments to Republic Act No. 8972, or the Solo Parents Welfare Act of 2000. These amendments included discounts on medicine, hospitalization fees, clothing, tuition, milk, and vitamins for solo parents and their children. In a statement, Sotto said that he is "ready and willing" to fight for the rights of single parents and assured the group that the amendments will be passed before December 2017.

On August 7, 2017, Sotto filed a resolution for the Senate Blue Ribbon committee to investigate the alleged unexplained wealth of Commission on Elections Chairman Andres Bautista.

At the start of the 18th Congress in 2019, Sotto regained his position as the 3rd highest ranking official in the Philippine government after he was re-elected as its Senate President. Sen. Panfilo Lacson administered the oath of Sotto. In his valedictory speech, he emphasized that the Senate will continue to be as independent but yet cooperative in the plans of the Duterte administration. Sotto, who served as Majority Floor Leader in his years way back in the Senate secured the support of his co-senators especially those in the majority. On the other hand, Senators Ralph Recto, Juan Miguel Zubiri and Franklin Drilon also regained their post after they were re-elected as Senate President Pro-Tempore, Majority Floor Leader and Minority Floor Leader, respectively.

2022 vice presidential campaign

On March 23, 2021, Sotto stated that he and fellow Senator Panfilo Lacson were being persuaded to form a tandem,  but the two senior legislators were still reluctant on deciding if they will file a candidacy together or individually, and when he was asked in an interview if he would run for higher office in the coming elections since he is term-limited and barred from running a third consecutive term as Senator, Sotto said that he is still undecided.  

On May 2021, Sotto revealed his contemplation on running for vice president in 2022 during a television interview on the ABS-CBN News Channel (ANC). Later on June 7, Sotto declared that if Panfilo Lacson decides to run for president in the 2022 election, he will "definitely" run as vice president in tandem with Lacson. By July 20, Sotto and Lacson made a press release revealing that they will run as a tandem in 2022, with the formal launch of their candidacies being held on September 8, the first campaign launch to be taped and edited before broadcast in Philippine history. 

Sotto and Lacson's platforms include restoring trust in the government and a better lifestyle for Filipinos, with solutions that revolved around addressing corruption. Sotto and Lacson planned to initiate an anti-corruption drive, reform the national budget, and digitalize government services.

Sotto only placed 3rd in the unofficial tally, eventually losing to Davao City Mayor Sara Duterte. On the next day, Sotto officially conceded, being quoted “The people have made their choice. I accept the will of the People,” he said.  Meanwhile his running mate Lacson, on the other hand, also lost his bid for president to Bongbong Marcos, placing fifth with nearly a million votes.

Political positions
Sotto has been described as a conservative by the local media because of his positions regarding social issues, owing to his Roman Catholic background. He has vocally expressed his opposition against measures on reproductive health and women's rights.

Sotto had been pushing for the restoration of the death penalty since he took office as a senator in 1992. He changed his stance on the penalty in 2021 when he entered the vice-presidential race in the upcoming 2022 presidential election, believing life imprisonment to be a better alternative. He and his presidential running mate Panfilo Lacson agree that the issue should be concentrated on improving jail conditions, advocating the construction of regional penitentiaries where criminals convicted of a heinous crime could be incarcerated if not in New Bilibid Prison.

Controversies

Issues surrounding the Pepsi Paloma rape case

In 1982, the 15-year-old actress Pepsi Paloma accused Sotto's brother Vic Sotto and comedians Joey de Leon and Richie D'Horsie of gang raping and taking photos of her on June 21 in a room at the Sulo Hotel in Quezon City. On July 31, Rey dela Cruz, Paloma's talent manager, lodged a formal complaint with Defense Minister Juan Ponce Enrile. On August 18, Paloma filed charges of rape and acts of lasciviousness against the three television personalities before the Quezon City fiscal's office. The crime of rape at the time, carried the death penalty in the Philippines, and to prevent his brother and cohorts from being sent to the electric chair, Sotto quickly went to see Paloma while she was still securing the services of Atty. Rene Cayetano. According to Paloma, Sotto coerced her into signing an "Affidavit of Desistance" to drop the rape charges against his brother and cohorts—Sotto had allegedly placed a pistol on the table in front of Paloma when he went to talk to her.

In exchange for the dismissal of the charges of rape, the accused issued a public apology towards Paloma, stating:

Three years later, Paloma was found dead in an apparent suicide. Dela Cruz was murdered years later.

On May 29, 2018, Sotto made a request to the online news site Inquirer.net to have the March 2014 articles by United States-based columnist Rodel Rodis removed: "The rape of Pepsi Paloma" and "Was Pepsi Paloma murdered?". The articles stated that he used his political connections to influence the outcome of the Pepsi Paloma rape case. After 34 years, in March 2016, Sotto denied involvement in the Pepsi Paloma rape case, stating that it was a gimmick of dela Cruz.

In response, the National Union of Journalists of the Philippines (NUJP) asked, "Does he believe his status and authority as Senate President give him better chances of having the stories taken down?"

On July 4, 2018, Inquirer.net took down the articles that Sotto had requested to be removed from their website. The NUJP condemned the takedown and issued a statement calling it "one of the darkest days in the annals of Philippine journalism".

As an unintended example of the Streisand effect, Sotto's takedown request of the Inquirer.net articles renewed public interest in the Paloma gang rape case.

Accusations of plagiarism
In 2012, Sotto was accused of plagiarizing several passages in a speech opposing the Reproductive Health Bill in the Philippine Senate. Several news agencies reported that Sotto had taken the passages from a 2011 blog entry by Sarah Pope. Sotto asserted that he was quoting Natasha Campbell-McBride, who was referenced in the blog post. Pope, upon learning of the controversy, confirmed Sotto's plagiarism on August 16, 2012 in another entry to her blog, strongly criticizing Sotto for the plagiarism, for denying it, and for his stance on contraceptives. She also remarked that she did not intend to sue. Meanwhile, Sotto's chief of staff admitted to using the blog post and failing to attribute Pope's work. Pope responded to the comment again criticizing Sotto's stance on the Reproductive Health Bill. On August 17, Sotto reasserted his defense saying: "I made a blanket disclosure. I mentioned beforehand my attributions, that I had many sources (of information in my speech) so I have admitted that. I have made a disclosure, so what’s their problem with that? They probably thought I’m trying to pass myself off as knowledgeable (on the subject) when in fact I’m not, supposedly, Where is the plagiarism there? They think that’s plagiarism. So come on, sue me." Villacorta said he saw nothing wrong with using Pope’s blog without attribution because it "is public domain" and "blogs are not covered by copyright. It is a new media and there is no jurisprudence yet." 

A few days later, South China Morning Post journalist, Raissa Robles also called out Sotto for plagiarizing five bloggers and a briefing paper – which includes a blog titled The Truth of Contraceptives, a blog titled Feminists for Choice, a blog titled Talking Sense by Marlon Ramirez, a New York University blog publishing works by birth control activist Margaret Sanger, and a briefing paper published by the Catholic Family and Human Rights Institute. Robles also remarked that Sotto would be championing digital piracy, she remarked: "Atty. Villacorta said that the Internet is free. (sic) This would mean that Senator Sotto would be championing digital piracy"

On November 9, 2012, Kerry Kennedy, the daughter of late American senator Robert F. Kennedy and president of the Robert F. Kennedy Center for Justice and Human Rights, wrote a public letter to Senator Sotto accusing him of flagrantly and deceptively plagiarizing the Robert F. Kennedy's 1966 Day of Affirmation speech in his remarks to the Philippine Senate last September 5, 2012. Sotto has since issued an apology to the Kennedy family, but tenaciously refused to admit that he committed plagiarism in his speech. Sotto reasoned that the allegedly plagiarized passage was obtained from a text message sent by a Christian leader, which he then translated into Filipino as he found it fit for his speech without knowing that the words were Kennedy's. He also argued that he never claimed the ideas and words as his own, therefore he did not plagiarize.

Sotto was one of the two senators who have inserted provision on libel under the Cybercrime Prevention Act of 2012 or Anti-Cybercrime Law. However, he denied that he did so in retaliation for the "cyberbullying" he received from Filipino netizens who criticized his alleged plagiarisms. Instead, he claimed that he intended to penalize those who release celebrity sex tapes and to allow the corresponding victims to seek redress.

Personal life
Sotto is married to Helen Gamboa, a beauty queen, actress, and singer.They have four children including Gian Carlo and Ciara, and eight grandchildren. Sotto is a devout Catholic.

Actors Oyo Boy Sotto and Miko Sotto (1982–2003) are his nephews. Singer-actress Sharon Cuneta is also his niece.

In the 2010 elections, his son Gian Carlo was elected councilor of Quezon City's 3rd District and served for three consecutive terms before being elected as the vice mayor of the city in the 2019 elections, while his daughter Diorella Maria "Lala" was elected in the 6th District of the same city before being appointed chairperson of the Movie and Television Review and Classification Board in 2022. His nephews Vico Sotto and Viktor Eriko "Wahoo" Sotto were elected mayor of Pasig and councilor of Parañaque's 2nd District, respectively.

Sotto has enlisted in the military as a reservist in the Philippine Army since 2013, ranked as Lieutenant Colonel. Prior to that, he was serving in the Philippine Constabulary, where he was a Major. 

Presently, he is the chairman of the Philippine Bowling Federation (PBF). Sotto also plays golf and has won several tournaments.

Filmography

Film

As actor

As composer only

Television

Notes

References

External links
Senator Vicente C. Sotto III – Senate of the Philippines

|-

1948 births
TV5 (Philippine TV network) personalities
ABS-CBN personalities
Anti-contraception activists
Asian Games bronze medalists for the Philippines
Asian Games medalists in bowling
Bowlers at the 1978 Asian Games
Cebuano people
Colegio de San Juan de Letran alumni
Filipino actor-politicians
Filipino male comedians
Filipino male film actors
20th-century Filipino male singers
Filipino male television actors
Filipino Roman Catholics
Filipino songwriters
Filipino film score composers
Filipino ten-pin bowling players
Filipino television variety show hosts
GMA Network personalities
Intercontinental Broadcasting Corporation personalities
Laban ng Demokratikong Pilipino politicians
Living people
Majority leaders of the Senate of the Philippines
Medalists at the 1978 Asian Games
Minority leaders of the Senate of the Philippines
Nationalist People's Coalition politicians
People from Cebu
People from Quezon City
People involved in plagiarism controversies
Politicians from Metro Manila
Presidents of the Senate of the Philippines
Radio Philippines Network personalities
Senators of the 9th Congress of the Philippines
Senators of the 10th Congress of the Philippines
Senators of the 11th Congress of the Philippines
Senators of the 12th Congress of the Philippines
Senators of the 15th Congress of the Philippines
Senators of the 16th Congress of the Philippines
Senators of the 17th Congress of the Philippines
Senators of the 18th Congress of the Philippines
Tito
Candidates in the 2022 Philippine vice-presidential election